Xushnud G‘ayratovich Xudayberdiyev (Uzbek Latin: Xushnud G‘ayratovich Xudayberdiyev, Uzbek Cyrillic: Хушнуд Ғайратович Худайбердиев;  (Russified form Khushnud Gayratovich Khudayberdiev; born 7 June 1989) is an Uzbek lawyer, blogger, and politician who has served as deputy director of the Uzbekistan National News Agency since 2020. He also known as a prominent veteran contestant of Zakovat, an Uzbek iteration of the intellectual game show What? Where? When? Xudayberdiyev has run a popular blog since 2012. He has a large social media following: as of October 2022, his Telegram channel has over 487,000 subscribers. In 2019, the Internet publication Sof selected Xudayberdiyev as the best blogger of the year.

Xudayberdiyev holds a master's degree in forensic science from the Tashkent State University of Law, which he obtained in 2012. He started his career as an instructor while studying at this university in 2010. From 2013 to 2017, he served as a legal consultant to the council of the Federation of Trade Unions of Uzbekistan. In January 2020, he was appointed Director of the Public Fund for the Support and Development of National Mass Media and held this position until June 2020, when he assumed his current position of deputy director of the Uzbekistan National News Agency.

Xudayberdiyev has received numerous awards and accolades throughout his career. In 2016, he was awarded the Oʻzbekiston belgisi (Badge of Uzbekistan) and became one of the first recipients of the Huquqiy targʻibot ishlari aʼlochisi (Legal Advocacy High Achiever) badge. In 2019, he was awarded the Kelajak bunyodkori (Builder of the Future) medal.

Born and raised in Chiroqchi District of Uzbekistan, Xudayberdiyev is married to the Uzbek poetess Mehrinoz Abbosova. The couple have a son.

Notes

References

External links 
 Website
 Official Telegram channel

1989 births
Living people
Uzbekistani bloggers
Uzbekistani lawyers
People from Qashqadaryo Region
21st-century Uzbekistani politicians